Mastung may refer to the following places in Pakistan:
 Mastung District
 Mastung, Pakistan, a town in the district
 Mastung Valley

See also 
 Mustang (disambiguation)